Kevin Llewellyn is an American painter.

Early life and education

Llewellyn was born in Ohio and graduated from the Ringling College of Art and Design.

Career 
Llewellyn is known for his realistic portraits, full-body portraits, and paintings that feature dark subject matter. He frequently utilizes techniques of 17th-century painting masters.

Kevin has taught art workshops at Gnomon, Wonderland LA, ConceptArt.org events and at colleges around the United States and Europe.

He was recently the opening artist for Kat Von D's art gallery, Wonderland LA.

Publications
Llewellyn illustrated the cover Nikki Sixx's album, This Is Gonna Hurt, as well as the cover of his photography book, '"This is Gonna Hurt: Music, Photography and Life, Through the Distorted Lens of Nikki Sixx.''

Llewellyn's work was also the subject of a solo exhibition, called "The Unsaid," at LA's Wonderland Gallery. A catalogue was produced for the exhibition.

Exhibitions

References

External links
Kevin Llewellyn's Official Website
Twitter
Kevin Llewellyn at Beinart Gallery

20th-century American painters
American male painters
21st-century American painters
1978 births
Living people
20th-century American male artists